Eldorado Canyon State Park is part of the Colorado State Park system. It was established in 1978 and is located in Boulder County near the city of Boulder. The park consists of two areas, the Inner Canyon (developed area) and Crescent Meadows (undeveloped area). The park encompasses  with a variety of recreation opportunities available. Eldorado Canyon is home to one of the world's most accessible and comprehensive rock climbing areas. This state park is open during daylight hours only, visitors are expected to leave before dusk.

History
Ute Indians were the first inhabitants into this area that is nestled against the foothills near Boulder. The Indians lived within the walls of the canyon because they provided protection from the harsh Colorado winters. Settlers soon followed in search of gold and agriculture. Eldorado Canyon is known for its geologic history dating back billions of years. Near the park’s entrance at the visitors center, there are rocks calculated to be over 1.5 billion years old.

At the beginning of the twentieth century, the community of Eldorado Springs was established and became known as a resort for the elite. The town offered visitors warm artesian springs and lush hotels, including the Crags Hotel, the Eldorado and the Grand View. Numerous celebrities and Denver residents enjoyed the beautiful getaway until a fire burned the Crags Hotel in 1912. Crags Hotel operated from 1908 to 1912.

The town also received attention between 1906 and 1949, when Ivy Baldwin performed tight rope acts across the canyon . More recent visitors appreciate views of the park from a higher perspective - but as rock climbers rather than from a tight rope.

Recreation

The biggest draw to Eldorado Canyon State Park is rock climbing. Eldorado Canyon offers over 1000 technical rock climbing routes. The beauty of this canyon also engages the non-climber. Rattlesnake Gulch Trail leads to the Crags Hotel Site and Continental Divide Overlook. Visitors may also picnic by or fish in scenic South Boulder Creek. In the winter, Eldorado offers hiking and cross-country skiing and snowshoeing.

Geography

The park entrance lies immediately west of Eldorado Springs on State Highway 170. To the west of Eldorado State Park is the Roosevelt National Forest and Colorado's Front Range. East of the site, there are the heavily populated areas of Boulder and Denver on the High Plains.

Climate
Snow and ice are common on roads and trails from mid-October through late April. In the summer months, snow is still possible but less common. Varying conditions throughout a given day can be expected throughout the year. Summer days can typically have beautiful sunny mornings and short sudden thunderstorms in the afternoon.

See also
 Boulder, Colorado
 Denver, Colorado
 Eldorado Springs, Colorado
 List of U.S. state parks
 List of Colorado state parks
 Rocky Mountain National Park
 Eldorado Mountain

References

External links
 

Protected areas of Boulder County, Colorado
State parks of Colorado
Rock formations of Colorado
Protected areas established in 1978
Landforms of Boulder County, Colorado
1978 establishments in Colorado